The Embassy of the Republic of Indonesia in Tokyo is the diplomatic mission of the Republic of Indonesia to Japan and concurrently accredited to the Federated States of Micronesia. The embassy is located at 4-4-1 Yotsuya, Shinjuku, Tokyo. Indonesia also has a consulate general in Osaka and two honorary consulates in Fukuoka dan Sapporo.

See also 

 Indonesia–Japan relations
 List of diplomatic missions of Indonesia
 List of diplomatic missions in Japan

References

External links 
 
 
 
 

Indonesia–Japan relations
Tokyo
Indonesia